Back to Avalon is an album by the saxophonist Teddy Edwards, recorded in 1960 for the Contemporary label. The results were shelved and not released until 1995.

Reception

AllMusic stated: "There are recordings that rank as underrated or under appreciated, but Back to Avalon should not merely be tagged as such. Thankfully—through hindsight—this recording was released in fully flowered form so all can realize what a marvelous all-around musician Teddy Edwards was".

Track listing 
All compositions by Teddy Edwards except as indicated
 "Avalon" (Buddy DeSylva, Al Jolson, Vincent Rose) - 2:49    
 "The Cellar Dweller" - 5:34    
 "You Don't Know What Love Is" (Gene de Paul, Don Raye) - 4:25    
 "Steppin' Lightly" - 7:20    
 "Sweet Georgia Brown" (Ben Bernie, Kenneth Casey, Maceo Pinkard) - 3:47    
 "Our Last Goodbye" - 4:41    
 "Good Gravy" - 6:32    
 "Under a Southern Moon and Sky" - 5:16    
 "Avalon" [alternate take] (DeSylva, Jolson, Rose) - 2:28

Personnel 
Teddy Edwards - tenor saxophone
Nathaniel Meeks - trumpet
Lester Robertson - trombone
Jimmy Woods - alto saxophone
Modesto Brisenio - baritone saxophone
Danny Horton - piano
Roger Alderson - bass
Larance Marable - drums

References 

Teddy Edwards albums
1995 albums
Contemporary Records albums